The Presidents Cup is the national Senior-level box lacrosse championship for the Canadian Lacrosse Association. The annual Championship awards a "Gold", "Silver", and "Bronze" placing. The skill levels have been adjusted in recent years; Senior "B" teams from across Canada now compete for the Presidents Cup (as before it was all Senior teams). Senior "A" is now represented by Ontario's Major Series Lacrosse and the Western Lacrosse Association (British Columbia), who compete for the Mann Cup.

History
There have been three trophies used for the Presidents Cup championships. The original trophy was known as the Castrol Oil Presidents Trophy and was awarded to teams from 1964 until 1971. 

In 1972, a new trophy was donated as a replacement and the old Castrol Oil trophy retired. The second trophy was in use from 1972 until 1995 when it too was retired. While the original Castrol Oil trophy was donated to the Canadian Lacrosse Hall of Fame in 1979, the second trophy was put into storage and became forgotten. Its existence was completely unknown to the Canadian Lacrosse Hall of Fame until the Canadian Lacrosse Association contacted the hall in late 2016 when it was found in their storage, which was donated to the lacrosse hall in February 2016. The original trophy underwent restoration work in 2015-2016 however the second trophy is still in need of some repair. 

The current trophy was donated for use starting in 1996 and has the following inscription: "Donated by the Iroquois Lacrosse Association and the '95 Presidents Cup winners, the Akwesasne Thunder, in honour and memory of the late Frank 'Tewisateni' Roundpoint, "Grandfather of Lacrosse", Akwesasne Mohawk Nation."

The first two years (1964-1965) of competition were essentially the result of provincial championship play in Ontario. The Hagerville Warriors won the Ontario Senior ‘B’ Championship in 1964 – however at some point they were later included in the list of Canadian national champions for Senior ‘B’ as the Ohsweken Warrriors even though 1965 was reported in the newspaper press at that time as the first year of a National Senior ‘B’ Championship in Canada. The following year the Fergus Thistles won the Ontario Senior ‘B’ Championship. Port Alberni Labatts won the British Columbia Senior ‘B’ Championship and arrangements were made for a National Championship series to be played – however it never took place. 

1965 saw the first true national competition between teams from different provinces when the Nanaimo Luckies and defending Fergus Thistles met in Nanaimo, British Columbia in a best of five series, which was swept 3-0 by Nanaimo and required a replay of the final 7 minutes and 15 seconds of the second game of the series after Fergus Thistles protested an officiating call.

Competing Leagues
Can-Am Senior B Lacrosse League (Can-Am)
Ontario Series Lacrosse (OSL)
Prairie Gold Lacrosse League (PGLL)
Quebec Senior Lacrosse League (QSLL)
Nova Scotia Senior Lacrosse League (NSSLL)
Rocky Mountain Lacrosse League (RMLL)
Three Nations Senior Lacrosse League (TNSLL)
West Coast Senior Lacrosse Association (WCSLA)

Medal history

Most Valuable Player award

Leading scorer